Maksat Boburbekov (born 19 March 1974) is a Kyrgyzstani wrestler. He competed in the men's freestyle 63 kg at the 2000 Summer Olympics.

References

 

1974 births
Living people
Kyrgyzstani male sport wrestlers
Olympic wrestlers of Kyrgyzstan
Wrestlers at the 2000 Summer Olympics
Place of birth missing (living people)
Asian Games medalists in wrestling
Wrestlers at the 1994 Asian Games
Wrestlers at the 1998 Asian Games
Medalists at the 1994 Asian Games
Asian Games silver medalists for Kyrgyzstan
20th-century Kyrgyzstani people
21st-century Kyrgyzstani people